The Dutch Caribbean Coast Guard (DCCG) ( (KWCARIB)) is the coast guard of the Kingdom of the Netherlands in the Dutch Caribbean. The unit is a joint effort between all constituent countries within the Kingdom.  Prior to the dissolution of the Netherlands Antilles, it was known as the Netherlands Antilles and Aruba Coast Guard (NA&A CG) and was a division of the Royal Netherlands Navy.

Tasks
 Detection and control: drugs, border control, customs control at sea, fisheries and environmental surveillance and monitoring of safe shipping.
 Services: continuous occupation and Rescue Coordination Center (RCC), handling of maritime distress and safety radio communications, search and rescue (SAR) and supporting maritime contingency.

Organization
DCCG is a partnership between Aruba, Sint Maarten, Curaçao, and the Netherlands. The staff of the Coast Guard is composed of all constituent countries. DCCG is a Kingdom organization directly under the State Council of Ministers of the Kingdom. The Commander of the Naval Forces of the Royal Netherlands Navy in the Caribbean (CZMCARIB) is also the director of DCCG.

Policy
Ministries from the four parts of the kingdom determine the policy of the Coast Guard. To streamline policy formulation the Coast Guard's Commission has been formed. This committee consists of officials from different ministries. The Coast Guard Commission also ensures budgets and annual reports. The judicial policy of the Coast Guard is determined by the three Ministers of Justice of the countries of the Kingdom. Controlling the Coast Guard executive in judicial matters is done through the Prosecutors-General of Aruba, Curaçao, St Maarten, and the Netherlands. The Secretary of Defense is on behalf of the State Ministers in charge of managing and controlling DCCG.

Coast Guard support centers
DCCG has three Coast Guard support centers: on Aruba, Curaçao and Sint Maarten. From here, the Coast Guard patrol boats patrol in the waters around the islands. The flying units of the Coast Guard are stationed at Coast Guard Air Station Hato, Curaçao. The Coast Guard Center / RCC itself is located in Curaçao, at the Parera naval base.

Units
DCCG has its own units and also makes use of defense resources (mainly from the RNLN, a ship and staff). DCCG has several private owned types of patrol boats, cutters and aircraft.

Cutters

The three Coast Guard cutters, the Jaguar, the Panther and Puma, are Damen Stan 4100 patrol vessels. They are designed for service in the coastal waters of the Caribbean islands. The cutters are suitable for carrying out all coast guard tasks. With the onboard RHIB, boarding operations can be performed.

Each boat has radar, infrared cameras, night vision binoculars, an ion scanner, a fixed 12.7 mm machine gun and a rotatable water cannon. Furthermore, they are equipped with photographic and video equipment to collect evidence.

Inshore boats
The inshore boats are mostly deployed within a mile from the coast. The boats of the type RHIB Sea 700 are in service in the Coast Guard since September 13, 1997. They have a curb and therefore very suitable for carrying out boarding operations on other boats without damaging them.  In addition, the boats, with a speed above , are very quick and well able to chase suspicious boats and arrest suspects. The Coast Guard has six of these boats.

Super RHIBS
The Coast Guard has twelve Super Rigid Hull Inflatable Boats, or SuperRhibs. The crew of the SuperRHIB can be up to six people. Whereas the inshore boats operate mostly close to shore, the SuperRHIBs operate at much wider and longer distance at sea. The inboard diesel engines and the longer form of the hull allow the SuperRHIB to deal with even worse weather conditions while maintaining good sailing characteristics.

AgustaWestland AW139

The DCCG employs two AgustaWestland AW139 helicopters for high speed chase, and search and rescue operations. The AgustaWestland AW139 helicopters are stationed at Coast Guard Air Station Hato and will be replaced by AgustaWestland AW189 in 2023.

Bombardier Dash 8
Since the autumn of 2007, the DCCG has two Bombardier Dash 8 Maritime Patrol Aircraft (designated MPA-D8). These planes are built to the specific needs of DCCG, based on the Coast Guard tasks such as search and rescue, and fisheries and environmental monitoring. These two Dash 8 aircraft equipped with modern means of day and at night to obtain optimal results in the performance of its duties. These resources include specially designed hatches dropping life rafts and drift / marker buoys, a high power searchlight in the nose of the aircraft with the aim to see and be seen in search situations, radar, and a communication and interlink software system. All these resources make it the ideal airplane in a coordinating role between various units and the RCC. Besides these functions, both Dash 8s can be deployed before, during and after hurricane passages to move people and resources to those areas that need help. For these missions the Dash 8s can be converted into transport aircraft configurations.

West Indies Guard Ship
The West Indies Guard Ship (WIGS) is a ship of the Royal Netherlands Navy that rotates about every six months. It can be a frigate but more commonly one of the Navy's Holland-class offshore patrol vessels is deployed to the region. This vessel usually carries an NHIndustries NH90 helicopter for search and rescue tasks and pursuit of suspect vessels.

A special boarding team from the U.S. Coast Guard can be embarked on board the WIGS, authorized to carry out boardings beyond the territorial waters of the Dutch Caribbean islands. This cooperation between Aruba, Curaçao, the Netherlands, Sint Maarten, the United States, and other actors is formalized in the Joint Interagency Task Force South, situated in Key West, Florida, United States.

Personnel
DCCG has approximately 160 personnel. Of these, 140 come from Aruba, Curaçao, and Sint Maarten, and 20 from the Royal Netherlands Navy. These 160 consist mostly of personnel actually deployed to carry out operations and the occupation of the Coast Guard bases. In addition, there are about 15 employees who staff the Operations Center / RCC 24 hours a day.

Ranks
Officer ranks

Enlisted ranks

See also
Netherlands Coastguard (Nederlandse Kustwacht), the Dutch Coast Guard

References

External links

Coast guards
Coast
Coast
Coast
Coast
Coast
Coast
Coast
Coast
Emergency management in the Netherlands
Disaster preparedness in the Caribbean